Capperia ningoris is a moth of the family Pterophoridae. It is found in North America, including California, Oregon and Alberta.

The wingspan is 18–20 mm. Adults are dark-brown with a grayish tint.

The larvae have been recorded feeding on Hieracium albiflorum. The young larvae were found webbing the heads and deforming the leaves of their host plant. They are green with a pale yellow head. Pupation takes place in a pale yellow pupa.

References

External links
mothphotographersgroup

Moths described in 1880
Oxyptilini